Kyzlasov Peak (Kızlasovtıñ tağı) is a peak in Khakassia, Russia. It is the highest point of the federal subject. 

This mountain was a formerly unnamed peak that was officially named in honor of Khakas historian and archaeologist Leonid Kyzlasov in 2016.

Description
It rises at the southern limit of Khakassia, in the Tashtypsky District, near the border of Tuva.

See also
 List of highest points of Russian federal subjects
 List of mountains and hills of Russia
 Khakassia Nature Reserve

References

External links
В ЗАКАЗНИКЕ "ПОЗАРЫМ" УСТАНОВЛЕН МЕМОРИАЛ ИМЕНИ ЛЕОНИДА КЫЗЛАСОВА
5 гор Хакасии, которые можно покорить
Гора Каратош. 2930м, наивысшая точка Хакасии.
Khakassia - Peak Visor

Kyzlasov
Landforms of Khakassia

ru:Пик Кызласова